Szymanek is a Polish surname. It is a patronymic surname derived from the given name Szymon. .Notable people with the surname include:

Nik Szymanek, British amateur astronomer and astrophotographer
Wojciech Szymanek (born 1982), Polish footballer
Jolanta Szymanek-Deresz (1954–2010), Polish politician

References

Polish-language surnames
Patronymic surnames